Gigg may refer to:
Gigg, Greater Manchester a suburb of Bury, Greater Manchester
Gigg Lane an all-seater football stadium in Bury, Greater Manchester
Ross Gigg, Australian rugby league footballer

See also
Gig (disambiguation) 
Giggs (disambiguation)